"The Surrey with the Fringe on Top" is a show tune from the 1943 Rodgers and Hammerstein musical Oklahoma!. The piece was recorded in 1952 by jazz pianist Ahmad Jamal, which influenced trumpeter Miles Davis to include it in his repertoire in the 1950s, which probably motivated other jazz musicians to play it.

References

External links
Lyrics

1943 songs
1940s jazz standards
Songs with music by Richard Rodgers
Songs with lyrics by Oscar Hammerstein II
Songs from Oklahoma!